Dr. Abdelgelil Mostafa is an Egyptian cardiologist and a political activist.

Abdelgelil Mostafa studied medicine at the Cairo University, and received his doctoral degree in 1966.

Before the 2011 Egyptian revolution, Dr. Abelgelil Mostafa was the general coordinator of the Egyptian Movement for Change. After the 2011 Egyptian Revolution, he joined the Justice Party as a founding member. Mostafa has been involved in preparing the Reawakening of Egypt electoral list that will run in the 2015 Egyptian parliamentary election.

References

Living people
Cairo University alumni
People of the Egyptian revolution of 2011
1934 births
People from Dakahlia Governorate